Piz de Groven is a mountain of the Lepontine Alps, located between Selma and Lostallo in the Swiss canton of Graubünden. With an elevation of 2,694 metres above sea level, it is the highest summit of the chain south of Pass de Buffalora (2,261 metres).

References

External links

 Piz de Groven on Hikr

Mountains of the Alps
Mountains of Switzerland
Mountains of Graubünden
Lepontine Alps
Two-thousanders of Switzerland
Calanca
Lostallo